Kirsten Thorndahl (also known as Kirsten Granlund) (9 April 1928  – 21 September 2007) was a Danish badminton player. She became the first player to become All England champion in all three categories: women's singles, women's doubles and mixed doubles. She reached the All England final 17 times and represented Denmark at the Uber Cup.

Medal record at the All England Badminton Championships

References

Danish female badminton players
1928 births
2007 deaths